The House of the Angel is a 1957 Argentine drama film directed by Leopoldo Torre Nilsson based the novel of the same name by his wife Beatriz Guido, who also co-wrote the screenplay.

The film was entered into the 10th Cannes Film Festival, where it competed for the Palme d'Or prize.

The film is considered a turning point in the history of Argentine cinema, as its international success contributed to the development of more national productions.

It was selected as the second greatest Argentine film of all time in a poll conducted by the Museo del Cine Pablo Ducrós Hicken in 1977, while it ranked 6th in the 1984 edition and 10th in the 2000 edition. In a new version of the survey organized in 2022 by the specialized magazines La vida util, Taipei and La tierra quema, presented at the Mar del Plata International Film Festival, the film reached the 22 position.

Cast 
Elsa Daniel - Ana
Lautaro Murúa - Pablo Aguirre
Guillermo Battaglia - Dr. Castro, Father of Ana
Berta Ortegosa - Señora de Castro, Mather of Ana
Yordana Fain - Naná
Bárbara Mujica - Vicenta
Alejandro Rey - Julian
Lili Gacel	- Julieta
Alicia Bellán

References

External links 

 
 
 
 
 

1957 films
1950s Spanish-language films
Argentine black-and-white films
1950s thriller drama films
Argentine thriller drama films
Films directed by Leopoldo Torre Nilsson
Films set in country houses
Films shot in Buenos Aires
1957 drama films
1950s Argentine films